A koeksister   is a traditional Afrikaner confectionery made of fried dough infused in syrup or honey. There is also a Cape Malay version of the dish, which is a fried ball of dough that is rolled in desiccated coconut called a koesister.  The name derives from the Dutch word "koek", which generally means a wheat flour confectionery, also the origin of the American English word "cookie", and "sister" can refer to the oral tradition of two sisters plaiting their doughnuts and then dunking them in syrup, so creating this iconic pastry. "Sis" can also refer to the sizzling sound.

Koeksisters are prepared by frying plaited dough strips in oil, then submersing the hot fried dough into ice cold sugar syrup. Koeksisters have a golden crunchy crust and liquid syrup centre, are very sticky and sweet, and taste like honey.

Popular brands include Ouma Rooi Koeksisters, whose founder won the Huletts Koeksister Competition before taking part in the popular South African Koekedoor Show.

A monument of a koeksister in the Afrikaner community of Orania alludes to the Afrikaner tradition of baking them to raise funds for the building of churches and schools.

See also
 List of African dishes
 List of doughnut varieties

References

Afrikaans words and phrases
South African English
Doughnuts
South African snack foods